Mirikizumab (INN; development code LY3074828) is a human monoclonal antibody designed for the treatment of psoriasis.

References 

Monoclonal antibodies